Olaf Backasch (born 4 October 1965) is a retired German footballer.

Playing career 
Backasch played for BSG Stahl Eisenhüttenstadt during the final years of the German Democratic Republic and reached the final of the 1990–91 NOFV-Pokal, where they lost 1–0 to F.C. Hansa Rostock. After a stint playing for FC Berlin, Backasch transferred to Tennis Borussia Berlin, making 16 appearances for them during the 1993–94 2. Bundesliga season. In 1996, he moved back to his home-town club Eisenhüttenstädter FC Stahl, where he played until his retirement in 2000.

References

External links 
 
 Olaf Backasch at kicker.de 

1965 births
Living people
Sportspeople from Eisenhüttenstadt
People from Bezirk Frankfurt
East German footballers
German footballers
Footballers from Brandenburg
Association football midfielders
2. Bundesliga players
Eisenhüttenstädter FC Stahl players
Berliner FC Dynamo players
Tennis Borussia Berlin players